Chartric "Chuck" Terrell Darby (born October 22, 1975) is a former American football defensive tackle. He was signed by the Tampa Bay Buccaneers as an undrafted free agent in 2001. He played college football for Willie Jeffries at South Carolina State.

Darby has also played for the Seattle Seahawks and Detroit Lions. He won a Super Bowl ring with the Buccaneers in Super Bowl XXXVII. With the Seahawks he played in Super Bowl XL as a starter.

Early years
Darby attended North High School in North, South Carolina and was a student and a letterwinner in football. In football, he was a four-year letterman and was an All-State selection.

References

External links
Detroit Lions bio

1975 births
Living people
People from North, South Carolina
African-American players of American football
Players of American football from South Carolina
American football defensive ends
American football defensive tackles
Tampa Bay Buccaneers players
Seattle Seahawks players
Detroit Lions players
21st-century African-American sportspeople
20th-century African-American sportspeople